Advanced Simulation Library (ASL) is free and open-source hardware-accelerated multiphysics simulation platform. It enables users to write customized numerical solvers in C++ and deploy them on a variety of massively parallel architectures, ranging from inexpensive FPGAs, DSPs and GPUs up to heterogeneous clusters and supercomputers. Its internal computational engine is written in OpenCL and utilizes matrix-free solution techniques. ASL implements variety of modern numerical methods, i.a. level-set method, lattice Boltzmann, immersed Boundary. Mesh-free, immersed boundary approach allows users to move from CAD directly to simulation, reducing pre-processing efforts and number of potential errors. ASL can be used to model various coupled physical and chemical phenomena, especially in the field of computational fluid dynamics.
It is distributed under the free GNU Affero General Public License with an optional commercial license (which is based on the permissive MIT License).

History 
Advanced Simulation Library is being developed by Avtech Scientific, an Israeli company. Its source code was released to the community on 14 May 2015, whose members packaged it for scientific sections of all major Linux distributions shortly thereafter. Subsequently, Khronos Group acknowledged the significance of ASL and listed it on its website among OpenCL-based resources.

Application areas 
 Computational fluid dynamics
 Computer-assisted surgery
 Virtual sensing
 Industrial process data validation and reconciliation
 Multidisciplinary design optimization
 Design space exploration
 Computer-aided engineering
 Crystallography
 Microfluidics

Advantages and disadvantages

Advantages 
 C++ API (no OpenCL knowledge required)
 Mesh-free, immersed boundary approach allows users to move from CAD directly to computations reducing pre-processing effort
 Dynamic compilation enables an additional layer of optimization at run-time (i.e. for a specific parameters set the application was provided with)
 Automatic hardware acceleration and parallelization of applications
 Deployment of same program on a variety of parallel architectures - GPU, APU, FPGA, DSP, multicore CPUs
 Ability to deal with complex boundaries
 Ability to incorporate microscopic interactions
 Availability of the source code

Disadvantages 
 Absence of detailed documentation (besides the Developer Guide generated from the source code comments)
 Not all OpenCL drivers are mature enough for the library

Features 
ASL provides a range of features to solve number of problems - from complex fluid flows involving chemical reactions, turbulence and heat transfer, to solid mechanics and elasticity.

 Interfacing: VTK/ParaView, MATLAB (export).
 import file formats: .stl .vtp .vtk .vti .mnc .dcm
 export file formats: .vti .mat
 Geometry:
 flexible and complex geometry using simple rectangular grid
 mesh-free, immersed boundary approach
 generation and manipulation of geometric primitives
 Implemented phenomena:
 Transport processes
 multicomponent transport processes
 compressible and incompressible fluid flow
 Chemical reactions
 electrode reactions
 Elasticity
 homogeneous isotropic elasticity
 homogeneous isotropic poroelasticity
 Interface tracking
 evolution of an interface
 evolution of an interface with crystallographic kinetics

Uses 
 ACTIVE - Active Constraints Technologies for Ill-defined or Volatile Environments (European FP7 Project)

References 

Computational chemistry software
Computer-aided engineering software for Linux
Software using the GNU AGPL license
Computational fluid dynamics
Free science software
Open Source computer aided engineering applications
Articles containing video clips
Libraries
Numerical libraries
Numerical libraries, C++